Pseudodanthonia is a genus of Himalayan plants in the grass family. The only known species is Pseudodanthonia himalaica, native to Uttarakhand and Uttar Pradesh in northern India

See also
Sinochasea trigyna, formerly Pseudodanthonia trigyna

References

Pooideae
Flora of West Himalaya
Flora of Uttar Pradesh
Grasses of India
Monotypic Poaceae genera
Taxa named by Charles Edward Hubbard